Aenigmarachne is a monotypic genus of tarantulas containing the single species, Aenigmarachne sinapophysis. It was first described by Günter E. W. Schmidt in 2005, and has only been found in Costa Rica.

See also
 List of Theraphosidae species

References

Endemic fauna of Costa Rica
Monotypic Theraphosidae genera
Spiders of Central America
Theraphosidae